Cache River may refer to:

Cache River (Arkansas)
 Cache River National Wildlife Refuge, Arkansas
Cache River (Illinois), site of the Cypress Creek National Wildlife Refuge